Mandan Commercial Historic District is a  historic district in Mandan, North Dakota that has work dating to 1884.  It was listed on the National Register of Historic Places (NRHP) in 1985.  The listing includes 35 contributing buildings and a contributing object.

It includes the Sullivanesque Lewis and Clark Hotel built in 1917, which is separately NRHP-listed.

Mandan was a major hub of the Northern Pacific Railway;  it became headquarters of NP's Missouri Division in 1916.

See also
National Register of Historic Places listings in Morton County, North Dakota

References

External links

Commercial buildings on the National Register of Historic Places in North Dakota
Victorian architecture in North Dakota
Historic districts on the National Register of Historic Places in North Dakota
National Register of Historic Places in Morton County, North Dakota
Mandan, North Dakota